The SI6 (Short Inline 6) is a family of straight-six engines developed by Volvo and used by Land Rover and Volvo.

History

Volvo designed the SI6 ("short inline 6") straight-6 automobile engine for use in 2007 models. An evolution of the company's long-used straight-5 Volvo Modular engine, which itself is an evolution of the Volvo B6304 straight six engine, the SI6 can be mounted transversely for front wheel drive or all wheel drive applications. Despite the added cylinder and displacement, the engine remains compact, and is in fact  shorter than the previous straight-5. The engine was initially offered in two displacements — a 3.0 L turbocharged version and a 3.2 L naturally aspirated version. Both offered variable cam timing, though only the turbo version varies both the intake and exhaust valves. On top of the variable cam timing used on the intake cam of the naturally aspirated engine it also had variable valve lift by using Cam Profile Switching (CPS).

Production of the Volvo SI6 began at the Ford Bridgend Engine Plant in Wales in May 2006. It was assumed that the engines would be used in European Ford and Jaguar products as well as Volvos.

Nomenclature
The engine codes consist of a series of letters and digits:
 1st: Fuel type (B) B = Bensin (Petrol)
 2nd: Number of cylinders (6)
 3rd & 4th: Approximate displacement in deciliters, may be rounded up or down. (29 ~= 3.0 L)
 5th: Valves per cylinder (4)
 6th: Induction method (S/T) S = suction (naturally aspirated), T = turbocharged
 7th: Engine variant (2/4/5)

Engine codes are not necessarily unique to a specific engine as power levels can vary depending on market, manufacturer and model.

3.0

The  straight-six engine is intercooled and turbocharged.

B6304T2

Applications:
 2008–2010 Volvo S80 II badged as S80 T6 or S80 T6 AWD
 2008–2010 Volvo S80L badged as S80L T6 or S80L T6 AWD
 2008–2010 Volvo V70 III badged as V70 T6 or V70 T6 AWD
 2009–2010 Volvo XC70 II badged as XC70 T6 or XC70 T6 AWD
 2009–2010 Volvo XC60 badged as XC60 T6 or XC60 T6 AWD

B6304T4

Applications: 
 2011–2015 Volvo S80 II badged as S80 T6 or S80 T6 AWD
 2011–2015 Volvo V70 III badged as V70 T6 or V70 T6 AWD
 2011–2015 Volvo XC70 II badged as XC70 T6 or XC70 T6 AWD
 2011–2016 Volvo XC60 badged as XC60 T6 or XC60 T6 AWD
 2011–2015 Volvo S60 II badged as S60 T6 or S60 T6 AWD
 2011–2018 Volvo V60 badged as V60 T6 or V60 T6 AWD

B6304T5

Applications:
 2014–2016 Volvo S60 II badged as S60 Polestar
 2015–2016 Volvo V60 badged as V60 Polestar

3.2

The  straight-six engine is naturally aspirated.

B6324S

Applications:
 2007–2010 Volvo XC90 badged as XC90 3.2
 2007–2010 Volvo S80 II badged as S80 3.2 or S80 3.2 AWD
 2008–2010 Volvo V70 III badged as V70 3.2 or V70 3.2 AWD
 2008–2010 Volvo XC70 II badged as XC70 3.2
 2010 Volvo XC60 badged as XC60 3.2 AWD

B6324S2

The B6324S2 has a power output of 228 PS (165 kW; 225 hp) at 6200 rpm, and produces 300 N⋅m (222 lb⋅ft) of torque at 3200 rpm.
Applications: 
 2010 Volvo S80 II badged as S80 3.2
 2010 Volvo XC70 II badged as XC70 3.2
 2010 Volvo XC60 badged as XC60 3.2

B6324S4

The B6324S4 has a power output of 241 PS (177 kW; 238 hp) at 6200 rpm, and produces 320 N⋅m (236 lb⋅ft) of torque at 3200 rpm.

Applications: 
 2011–2014 Volvo S80 II badged as S80 3.2
 –2014 Volvo XC70 II badged as XC70 3.2
 –2014 Volvo XC60 badged as XC60 3.2

B6324S5

Applications: 
 2011–2014 Volvo XC90 badged as XC90 3.2
2011–2014 Volvo S80 II badged as S80 3.2
 2011–2014 Volvo V70 III badged as V70 3.2
 2011–2015 Volvo XC70 II badged as XC70 3.2
 2011–2014 Volvo XC60 badged as XC60 3.2

Applications:
 2006–2012 Land Rover Freelander 2/LR2

See also

 List of Ford engines
 List of Volvo engines

References

SI6
SI6
Straight-six engines
Gasoline engines by model